The dark-nosed small-footed myotis (Myotis melanorhinus) is a species of mouse-eared bat in the family Vespertilionidae, described in 1890, and indigenous to Canada, Mexico, and the United States. While the International Union for Conservation of Nature suggests that M. melanorhinus is uncommon, the species nonetheless enjoys an extensive habitat, at least encompassing British Columbia, central Mexico, and Oklahoma.

See also
List of mammals of Canada
List of mammals of Mexico
List of mammals of the United States

Footnotes

External links

Mammals described in 1890
Mammals of Canada
Mammals of Mexico
Mammals of the United States
Mouse-eared bats
Taxa named by Clinton Hart Merriam